Jamie Elliott (born 21 August 1992) is a professional Australian rules footballer playing for the Collingwood Football Club in the Australian Football League (AFL).

Early life
Elliott lived in Dongara, Western Australia before his family moved to Queensland. His father died when he was a teenager and his family moved to Euroa, Victoria where he played for the Murray Bushrangers in the TAC Cup. In 2011, he was invited to play two games for Collingwood in the Victorian Football League (VFL).

AFL career
He made his debut in round 9, 2012, against  at AAMI Stadium.

In round 2, 2013, he set three career bests, kicking five goals, taking ten marks and sixteen kicks in a 17-point comeback win over Carlton.

Elliott had a good start to the 2014 season, but later in the year he was restricted by a recurring hamstring injury. During March of that year he was diagnosed with hamstring tendinitis.

Elliott kicked 35 goals in 2015, making him Collingwood’s most prolific goalkicker. He missed the 2016 season, due to back surgery.

He played 17 games and kicked 34 goals during the 2017 season, but missed the 2018 season due to ankle surgery.

Elliott played 16 games in 2019, and was the subject of extensive rumours that he would be traded from Collingwood, with Melbourne, Hawthorn, the Western Bulldogs, and North Melbourne all being cited as potential destinations. Ultimately, Elliott decided to remain at Collingwood.

Statistics
Updated to the end of the 2022 season.

|-
| 2012 ||  || 35
| 15 || 6 || 11 || 99 || 55 || 154 || 57 || 62 || 0.4 || 0.7 || 6.6 || 3.7 || 10.3 || 3.8 || 4.1 || 0
|-
| 2013 ||  || 19
| 20 || 30 || 16 || 152 || 99 || 251 || 90 || 58 || 1.5 || 0.8 || 7.6 || 5.0 || 12.6 || 4.5 || 2.9 || 3
|-
| 2014 ||  || 19
| 17 || 33 || 11 || 190 || 66 || 256 || 101 || 60 || 1.9 || 0.6 || 11.2 || 3.9 || 15.1 || 5.9 || 3.5 || 6
|-
| 2015 ||  || 5
| 20 || 35 || 14 || 202 || 87 || 289 || 111 || 63 || 1.8 || 0.7 || 10.1 || 4.4 || 14.5 || 5.6 || 3.2 || 3
|-
| 2016 ||  || 5
| 0 || — || — || — || — || — || — || — || — || — || — || — || — || — || — || —
|-
| 2017 ||  || 5
| 17 || 34 || 16 || 163 || 76 || 239 || 103 || 38 || 2.0 || 0.9 || 9.6 || 4.5 || 14.1 || 6.1 || 2.2 || 1
|-
| 2018 ||  || 5
| 0 || — || — || — || — || — || — || — || — || — || — || — || — || — || — || —
|-
| 2019 ||  || 5
| 16 || 26 || 18 || 144 || 47 || 191 || 89 || 37 || 1.6 || 1.1 || 9.0 || 2.9 || 11.9 || 5.6 || 2.3 || 5
|-
| 2020 ||  || 5
| 18 || 10 || 10 || 141 || 86 || 227 || 51 || 57 || 0.6 || 0.6 || 7.8 || 4.8 || 12.6 || 2.8 || 3.2 || 0
|-
| 2021 ||  || 5
| 13 || 25 || 8 || 127 || 73 || 200 || 61 || 32 || 1.9 || 0.6 || 9.8 || 5.6 || 15.4 || 4.7 || 2.5 || 3
|-
| 2022 ||  || 5
| 19 || 28 || 19 || 172 || 93 || 265 || 72 || 66 || 1.5 || 1.0 || 9.1 || 4.9 || 13.9 || 3.8 || 3.5 || 3
|- class=sortbottom
! colspan=3 | Career
! 155 !! 227 !! 123 !! 1390 !! 682 !! 2072 !! 735 !! 473 !! 1.5 !! 0.8 !! 9.0 !! 4.4 !! 13.4 !! 4.7 !! 3.1 !! 24
|}

Notes

Honours and achievements
Individual
 2× Collingwood Leading Goalkicker Award: 2015 (35), 2017 (34)
 AFL Mark of the Year: 2013
 22under22 team: 2014
 Harry Collier Trophy (Collingwood Best Young Player Award): 2012

References

External links

 
 

1992 births
Living people
Collingwood Football Club players
Australian rules footballers from Victoria (Australia)
Murray Bushrangers players